Indiani is a monotypic genus of South American long-spinneret ground spiders containing the single species, Indiani gaspar. It was first described by B. V. B. Rodrigues, I. Cizauskas and Y. Lemos in 2020, and placed into the Prodidominae subfamily.  it has only been found in Brazil.

See also
 List of Prodidominae species

References

Prodidominae
Spiders of Brazil